The  was an army of the Imperial Japanese Army during World War II.

History
The Japanese 51st Army was formed on April 8, 1945, under the Japanese Twelfth Area Army as part of the last desperate defense effort by the Empire of Japan to deter possible landings of Allied forces in central Honshū during Operation Downfall. The Japanese 51st Army was based in Tsuchiura, Ibaraki Prefecture and was thus intended to guard the northern beachhead to Tokyo and the Kantō region. It consisted mostly of poorly trained reservists, conscripted students and Volunteer Fighting Corps home guard militia. The Japanese 51st Army was demobilized at the surrender of Japan on August 15, 1945, without having seen combat.

List of Commanders

References

External links

51
Military units and formations established in 1945
Military units and formations disestablished in 1945